The Forum Fisheries Agency is an organization run by the Pacific Islands Forum.  
It operates the Regional Fisheries Surveillance Centre, headquartered in the Solomon Islands, and annually runs an Operation Kurukuru—a joint effort to board and inspect suspicious fishing vessels.

References

Pacific Islands Forum
International organizations based in Oceania
Fishing industry